State Central Library of Kerala is also known as Trivandrum Public Library. It is in the center of Thiruvananthapuram city, the capital of Kerala.       PH 7736893884

History 

The Library was  established in 1829 during the reign of King Swathi Thirunal of Travancore. The work of starting and organising the Library was entrusted to Col. Edward Cadogan, then the British Resident who was the grand son of  Sir Hans Sloane, the founder of the British Museum. Col. Cadogan was the first president of the Trivandrum Public Library committee, which managed the affairs of the Library. At that time, only a privileged class who were called to attend the Durbar of His Highness the Maharaja was  allowed admission to the Library. The Library was then known as "Trivandrum People’s Library".

Other landmarks in the history of library are:

 1898 AD - The assets of Trivandrum People's Library were transferred to the administrative control of Government and was opened to the public.
 1900 AD - His Highness Sree Moolam Thirunal constructed the present building for housing the library, which is an architectural beauty in the Gothic style, in commemoration  of the Diamond Jubilee of Her Majesty Queen Victoria.
 1938 AD - The administration of the Trivandrum Public Library was handed over to University of Travancore (now University of Kerala).
 1948  - The State Government was directed to take over the administration of the Library from the University by a resolution of the State Legislature.
 1958 - The Library was declared as the ‘State Central Library’ of Kerala.
 1988 - The library was given the status of a minor department under the administrative control of Higher Education Department of Government of Kerala.
2005 - A New Heritage Model building was constructed within the campus for Children's Library.
2007- Online reservation and RF ID  facility is introduced

Sections

Technical Section
Circulation Section (Books & Periodicals)
English Section
Malayalam Section
Hindi / Sanskrit Section
Reference Section
Children's Section
Binding Section
Reprographic Section
Closed Reference Section
Member's Reading Room (For A & B Member's only)
General Reading Room (For C & D Member's & Non Member's)
Cash Section
Administrative Office
Internet Browsing Centre
Kerala Gazette Section
Multimedia Section
Digital Library
British Library Collection
A Library science certification course in place.

Digital library 

Library has a digital collection in searchable format of 709 books, in English and Malayalam.

Children's library

The New Heritage Model building within the campus is devoted for Children's library.  A multimedia Section is also functioning in this building.

The library is also conducting a certificate course in Library and information science.

References
 Official Website of Kerala Government

External links

 Official website of State Central Library, Kerala
 Official webpage of Department of Higher Education, Kerala State
 Official website of Government of Kerala

Libraries in Thiruvananthapuram
Public libraries in India
1829 establishments in India
Government buildings in Kerala
Libraries established in 1829